Maine Question 1, formally An Act to Legalize Marijuana, is a citizen-initiated referendum question that qualified for the Maine November 8, 2016 statewide ballot. It was qualified for the ballot after a Maine Superior Court judge ordered that petitions rejected by the Maine Secretary of State be reconsidered.  The proposal sought to legalize the recreational use of marijuana in Maine for those over the age of 21, and institute a 10 percent tax on its sale.  As the Maine Legislature and Governor Paul LePage declined to enact the proposal as written, it appeared on the ballot along with elections for President of the United States, Maine's two U.S. House seats, the Legislature, other statewide ballot questions, and various local elections.

According to uncertified results, the referendum passed by 50.3% to 49.7%, a margin of under 5,000 votes. On November 10, two days after the election, the Associated Press called the result in favor of the "Yes" vote. However, opponents of the measure requested a recount and then withdrew their request on December 17.

After the partially completed recount, the results were certified as 381,768 in favor and 377,773 opposed. As of 2021, Question 1's results remain the narrowest margin of victory for any successful marijuana legalization measure in U.S. history.

Background
The passage of ballot measures in Colorado and Washington in 2012 which legalize marijuana has led to efforts across the United States to do so.  The use of marijuana for medical purposes has been legal in Maine since 1999.  Attempts by the Maine Legislature to legalize recreational marijuana have not succeeded, including one effort to put the question directly onto the ballot.  Some success in legalization has been seen at the local level, with Portland legalizing recreational use in 2013 by a wide margin.  It has also been legalized in South Portland but a legalization effort in Lewiston failed.

Petitions for two separate groups to collect signatures to place a ballot measure on the 2016 ballot were issued by the Maine Secretary of State's Office, one on April 28, 2015 to a group called Legalize Maine, and another on June 3, 2016 to the Campaign to Regulate Marijuana Like Alcohol, which is affiliated with the Marijuana Policy Project. The two proposals were similar but Legalize Maine's was more permissible, legalizing up to 2.5 oz. for use by those 21 and older, as opposed to only 1 oz. under the MPP's proposal. It also called for a 10 percent tax on marijuana. Legalize Maine promoted their proposal as "home grown". The two groups agreed to combine their efforts on October 26, 2015 and coalesce behind Legalize Maine's proposal, so that there would only be one legalization effort.  An effort by State Rep. Mark Dion (D-Portland) to pass a bill legalizing marijuana failed on June 22, 2015, largely because legislators did not want to undercut the petition gathering effort.  Dion had felt that the Legislature should get out in front on this issue to avoid having to fix a poorly written referendum proposal later.

Supporters of legalization turned in 99,929 signatures to Secretary of State Matthew Dunlap on February 1, 2016.  A small group protested those delivering the signatures outside the Secretary's Office, objecting to out of state groups being involved in the legalization effort.

Status of petitions
Dunlap announced on March 2, 2016 that the petition gathering effort had failed and the issue did not qualify for the ballot.  He stated that his office could only validate 51,543 signatures, well below the 61,123 required to get to the ballot. 13,525 signatures were rejected as not belonging to registered Maine voters, and a smaller number was rejected for various other errors.  The largest number of signatures rejected, 31,338, was due to signatures of a notary public and petition circulators who signed the oaths on the petitions not matching those on file with the Secretary of State's Office. Dunlap stated that "We’re not saying any malfeasance was or wasn’t done, that’s not up to us to determine. Our goal isn’t to invalidate signatures. The goal is to make sure they are valid."    Supporters immediately announced that they would appeal the decision to Maine Superior Court, stating that "we sincerely hope that 17,000-plus Maine citizens will not be disenfranchised due to a handwriting technicality."

One of the notaries in question, Stavros Mendros, publicly stated that he had signed the petitions but that given the sheer volume of papers he had to sign in a short amount of time, which he claimed was almost 15,000 papers, it would be almost impossible for him to write his signature exactly the same each time. The Portland Press Herald obtained copies of petitions and sent them to independent handwriting experts who stated that in their opinion the signatures were all within natural variations in handwriting and were likely from the same person. Supporters also criticized Dunlap's office for not using handwriting experts or discussing their concerns with supporters to validate the signatures.

Judge Michaela Murphy ruled on April 8, 2016 that the rejected petitions should be reinstated for consideration. In her opinion, Murphy stated that Dunlap had committed an error of law by applying an "overly burdensome" interpretation of the law.  Murphy explained that signatures gathering and oath administration are often done under less than ideal conditions and that requiring perfect signature reproduction on each form signed was unreasonable. Dunlap announced on April 13 that he had declined to appeal the decision and would begin re-reviewing the previously rejected petitions.

Dunlap announced on April 27 that about 11,000 previously invalidated signatures were found to be valid, which meant that the referendum qualified for the ballot. The proposal went to the Legislature for consideration, but they declined to approve it and sent it to the ballot. The question will appear on the ballot as "Do you want to allow the possession and use of marijuana under state law by persons who are at least 21 years of age, and allow the cultivation, manufacture, distribution, testing, and sale of marijuana and marijuana products subject to state regulation, taxation and local ordinance?"

Campaign
Maine Attorney General Janet Mills expressed concern that the law as written would legalize marijuana use for all ages, calling the language of the bill "troublesome".

Notable endorsements

Supporters
ACLU of Maine
Marijuana Policy Project
Eric Brakey, Republican State Senator
Mark Dion, State Representative (D-Portland), former Cumberland County Sheriff
David Miramant, Democratic State Senator
Diane Russell, State Representative (D-Portland)
Ryan Fecteau, State Representative (D-Biddeford)
Brian Hubbell, State Representative (D-Bar Harbor)
Larry Dunphy, State Representative (I-Embden)
Matt Moonen, State Representative (D-Portland)
Deane Rykerson, State Representative (D-Kittery)
Scott Hamman, State Representative (D-South Portland)
Peter Stucky, State Representative (D-Portland)
MaineToday Media newspapers; Portland Press Herald, Kennebec Journal, Morning Sentinel

Opponents
American Automobile Association
Paul LePage, Governor of Maine
Walt Whitcomb, Commissioner of the Maine Department of Agriculture
Smart Approaches to Marijuana
Maine Public Health Association
Maine Hospital Association
Maine Medical Association
Maine Association of School Nurses
Maine State Chamber of Commerce
Alliance for Addiction and Mental Health Services, Maine
National Alliance on Mental Illness Maine
Maine Chiefs of Police Association
Bangor Region Chamber of Commerce
Maine State Police
Aroostook Substance Abuse Prevention
Cumberland County Sheriffs Office
Yarmouth Police Department
Cumberland Police Department
Concerned Women for America of Maine
Falmouth Police Department
Christian Civic League of Maine
Dixfield Police Department
Bangor Daily News
Ellsworth American

Public opinion

Recount
On 5 December 2016 the state of Maine called for an official recount of the ballots regarding Question 1, a process expected to take a month or more and cost up to $500,000. The International Business Times reported that governor Paul LePage said: 
... he would be taking up the issue with president-elect Donald Trump to find out if the incoming administration would enforce federal laws prohibiting legal marijuana use. However, if Trump decides to keep cannabis laws at the state level, LePage said he would accept the law.

By December 16, around 30% of all ballots cast had been recounted, including those from Maine's largest city of Portland without any notable change in the results. The recount was ordered suspended until after January 1, and the No on 1 campaign filled out the requisite paperwork to formally cancel the recount one day later.

Results

Election night

After recount

See also
Cannabis in the United States
Colorado Amendment 64
Washington Initiative 502

References

External links
Campaign to Regulate Marijuana Like Alcohol , supporters of the initiative
Mainers Protecting our Youth and Communities, opponents of the initiative

Cannabis in Maine
2016 cannabis law reform
Cannabis ballot measures in the United States
2016 Maine ballot measures